Ni Nengah Widiasih (born 12 December 1992) is an Indonesian powerlifter. She competed in the 2012 Summer Paralympics, 2016 Summer Paralympics and 2020 Summer Paralympics.

Biography
Widiasih was born and raised in Karangasem, Bali. She lost use of her legs at age four and began using a wheelchair. When she was in the sixth grade she began living at the dormitory run by the Disabled Children's Counselling Foundation. Her daily expenses were handled by the foundation, and, beginning in middle school, her education was paid for through scholarships. , she is in the second year of senior high school.

At the suggestion of her brother, fellow weightlifter I Gede Suantaka, Widiasih took up weightlifting. She began practising four to five times weekly. In 2008, she won a bronze medal at the ASEAN ParaGames in Nakhon Ratchasima, while the following year she received a silver medal at the Games in Kuala Lumpur. She also medaled at national level competitions in Surakarta and Bali. She competes in the 40 kilogram class.

Widiasih competed at the 2011 ASEAN ParaGames, held in Surakarta in December, after her class was nearly cut by a referee as "illegitimate". This effort also won her a gold medal. For the games she was coached by Agus Sugiharto. In February 2012 she won a bronze medal at the Malaysia Open Powerlifting Championship in Kuala Lumpur.

Widiasih was on the six-member shortlist to compete in the 2012 Summer Paralympics in London; in June it was announced that she would be one of three athletes competing, along with David Jacobs (table tennis) and an athletics competitor. She was the only one from the country who competed in powerlifting; she competed in the 40 kilogram class.

References
Footnotes

Bibliography

External links
 

Living people
1989 births
Balinese people
People from Karangasem Regency
Sportspeople from Bali
Indonesian female weightlifters
Female powerlifters
ASEAN ParaGames competitors
Paralympic powerlifters of Indonesia
Powerlifters at the 2012 Summer Paralympics
Powerlifters at the 2016 Summer Paralympics
Powerlifters at the 2020 Summer Paralympics
Medalists at the 2016 Summer Paralympics
Medalists at the 2020 Summer Paralympics
Paralympic silver medalists for Indonesia
Paralympic bronze medalists for Indonesia
Paralympic medalists in powerlifting
21st-century Indonesian women